This is a list of seasons completed by the Houston Astros, originally known as the Houston Colt .45s, a professional baseball franchise based in Houston, Texas; they played in the National League from their inception in 1962 to the 2012 season; in 2013, the team was moved to the American League.

The Astros in total have completed 61 seasons in Major League Baseball, qualifying for the postseason sixteen times and reaching the World Series five times (2005, 2017, 2019, 2021 and 2022) with two world championships (2017, 2022). The team was established as an expansion franchise in 1962, one of eight teams that was created in the decade. The team's first winning season was in 1972. In 1980, the Astros made their first postseason appearance. From 1997 to 2005, the team made postseason appearances in six out of nine seasons. From 2006 to 2013, the franchise experienced a steady decline, bottoming out with three consecutive 100-loss seasons in 2011, 2012, and 2013. In 2015, the team defeated the New York Yankees in the 2015 American League Wild Card Game. This was the Astros' first postseason appearance as an American League team, and first overall since 2005. It was also the Astros' first playoff win since Game 6 of the 2005 National League Championship Series. Houston would qualify for the playoffs again in 2017, defeating the Boston Red Sox in the 2017 American League Division Series and the New York Yankees in the 2017 American League Championship Series. The team would go on to defeat the Los Angeles Dodgers in the 2017 World Series, winning the championship for the first time in team history. They are only team to have qualified for the World Series as a member of both leagues, and one of two to have qualified for the League Championship Series in both leagues (the Milwaukee Brewers being the other). As of 2019, the Astros are one of just a few teams in MLB history to post three consecutive 100-win seasons, a record oddly symmetrical with the three consecutive 100-loss seasons posted several years prior during their rebuild.

Through 61 seasons of baseball (57 while known as the Astros), the Astros have recorded 34 seasons at .500 or better, thirty of which have been winning campaigns, and have qualified for the playoffs sixteen times; of the fourteen expansion teams that have been created since 1961, their sixteen appearances are the most for any team. They are the only team in the history of Wild Card era baseball to play in six consecutive League Championship Series and also the only expansion era team with an all-time record above .500.

Regular season record-by-year

The Astros finished the season tied for first place with the Los Angeles Dodgers. Houston defeated the Dodgers, 7–1, in a one-game playoff to clinch the division title.
The 1981 Major League Baseball strike caused the season to be split into two halves. The Astros earned a berth in an expanded postseason tournament by finishing in first place in their division in the second half of the season. The Los Angeles Dodgers had finished the first half in first place to earn the division's other playoff berth.
The 1994–95 Major League Baseball strike, which started on August 12, 1994, led to the cancellation of the playoffs and World Series.
The 1994–95 MLB strike lasted until April 2, 1995, causing the shortening of the 1995 season to 144 games.
In a rare occurrence, because he was traded mid-season, Zack Greinke technically won both his Gold Glove and DPOY Award in the NL, despite stats from the latter third of the season, which he spent with the Astros in the AL, also factoring into the awards. He also won a Silver Slugger; however, due to the designated hitter option, he had no offensive stats from the AL to factor into this award, so, unlike the others, it is not considered part of his Astros resume for the year.

Record by decade 
The following table describes the Astros' MLB win–loss record by decade.

These statistics are from Baseball-Reference.com's Houston Astros History & Encyclopedia, and are current through 2022.

Postseason appearances

Postseason record by year
The Astros have made the postseason sixteen times, with the first one being in the 1980 season. They are one of eight teams as of 2022 to have a winning postseason series record.

Footnotes

 
Houston Astros
Seasons